Birbal (born Mahesh Das; 1528  16 February 1586), or Raja Birbal, was a Saraswat Hindu Bhatt Brahmin advisor and main commander (Mukhya Senapati) of army in the court of the Mughal emperor, Akbar. He is mostly known in the Indian subcontinent for the folk tales which focus on his wit. Birbal was appointed by Akbar as a Minister (Mantri) and used to be a Poet and Singer in around 1556–1562. He had a close association with Emperor Akbar and was one of his most important courtiers, part of a group called the navaratnas (nine jewels). In February 1586, Birbal led an army to crush an unrest in the north-west Indian subcontinent where he was killed along with many troops in an ambush by the rebel tribe. He was the only Hindu to adopt Din-i Ilahi, the religion founded by Akbar. Birbal was one of the first officers to join Akbar's court, possibly as early as 1556, when he was twenty-eight years old. He also had a naturally generous nature and all these traits combined—elegant repartee, largesse, and poetical talent—made Birbal the ideal Mughal courtier.

Local folk tales emerged primarily in 19th century involving his interactions with Akbar, portraying him as being extremely clever and witty. However, it is highly unlikely that they are true considering the strict court etiquette of the Mughals, which would not have tolerated outspoken attitude of anyone like Birbal, and these tales are not mentioned in any official Mughal document. As the tales gained popularity in India, he became even more of a semi-fictional legendary figure across the Indian subcontinent. These most probably fictional tales involve him outsmarting rival courtiers and sometimes even Akbar, using only his intelligence and cunning, often with giving witty and humorous responses and impressing Akbar.

Early life
Birbal was born as Mahesh Das in 1528, to a Brahmin family in Kalpi , Jalaun , Uttar Pradesh;in a  called Ghoghra. His father was Ganga Das and mother was Anabha Davito. He was the third son of a family that had a previous association with poetry and literature.

Educated in Hindi, Sanskrit and Persian, Birbal wrote prose, specialised in music and poetry in the Braj language, thus gaining fame. He served at the Rajput court of Raja Ram Chandra of Rewa (Madhya Pradesh), under the name "Brahma Kavi". Birbal's economic and social status improved after getting married to a woman of a wealthy family, contrary to the notion that he was on poor economic terms before his appointment at Mughal Emperor Akbar's imperial court.

At the imperial court

Titles and name origin

The details and year of his first meeting with Akbar and his employment at the court are disputed but estimated to be between 1556 and 1562. He became the "Kavi Priya" (poet laureate) of the Emperor within a few years of his appointment. Akbar bestowed upon him the name 'Birbal' with the title "Raja", by which he was known from then on.

Birbal comes from Bir Bar or Vir Var which means hasir javab or quick thinker. Akbar gave titles to his Hindu subjects according to their traditions and S. H. Hodivala writes that it could have been taken from a character in the folk tale Vetal Panchvinshati. This featured a courtier called Vir Var who showed great loyalty to his king. Akbar was also fond of literature, having works of Sanskrit and other local languages translated into Persian.

Position and association with Akbar
His growing reputation led him to be part of Akbar's nine advisers, known as the Navaratna - the nine jewels. Birbal also played the role of a religious advisor, military figure and close friend of the Emperor, serving him for 30 years. In 1572, he was among a large army sent to aid Husain Quli Khan against an attack from the Akbar's brother, Hakim Mirza, which was his first military role. He later accompanied the Emperor during his Gujarat campaigns. Despite having no military background, he often participated in Akbar's campaigns and was given leadership positions, like Todar Mal, who was an advisor in economic matters.

Abu'l-Fazl ibn Mubarak and Abdul Qadir Badayuni were historians of the court. While Fazl respected him, listed him as having twenty-five honorific titles and rank of a commander of two thousand; Badayuni distrusted Birbal because he was a Hindu, calling him a "bastard" and in contempt, writing how he, as a Hindu musician, was getting favour and becoming the king's "confidant", but at the same time acknowledging his talent. Akbar's other orthodox Muslim advisers were known to dislike Birbal. Most of Akbar's courtiers, when they failed to meet his expectations, like in the case of Raja Man Singh I, when he failed to pursue Maharana Pratap in the Battle of Haldigathi. According to Monserrate, among all of Akbar's officials, Faizi, Tansen, and Birbal didn't incur any displeasure in their years of service.

Akbar had started a religion called Din-i-Ilahi, which acknowledged him as God's representative on earth and had a combination of Hindu and Muslim beliefs. In the Ain-i-Akbari (The Institutes of Akbar), it is mentioned that Birbal was one of the few people other than Akbar who were its followers, besides being the only Hindu. He had a close association with Akbar, despite being fourteen years elder than him; of the nine ratnas, Birbal was often called the brightest jewel. Badaoni referred to this in sarcasm, as "a case of 'thy flesh is my flesh and thy blood my blood'". Akbar is reported to have saved Birbal's life in two instances.

The painting Akbari Nao Ratna in Victoria hall, Kolkata depicts Birbal having a prominent position right next to Akbar. The Emperor found him entertaining at the start but in later years, sent him on important missions. Birbal was said to have received a two-storey house in Fatehpur Sikri within the palace complex, built close to Akbar's own chambers. He was said to enjoy having Birbal by his side and he was the only courtier to reside within the palace complex. One of the seven gates is known as "Birbal's gate".

Death 
The Yusufzai Afghan tribe had started a rebellion along the east bank of river Indus against the Mughal rule. After troops sent to crush the unrest suffered losses, Akbar sent Birbal with reinforcements from where the Afghanis were waiting in prepared positions in the hills. In the ensuing ambush and heavy defeat, Birbal and over 8000 soldiers were killed. This was one of the largest military losses for Akbar. He was said to have expressed his grief over the loss his favourite courtier and not taken food or drink for two days. He was anguished since his body could not be found for Hindu cremation. He proclaimed that it was his greatest tragedy since his coming to the throne.

Badayuni writes,His majesty cared for the death of no grandee more than for that of Birbal. He said, 'Alas! they could not even get his body out of the pass, that it might have been burned"; but at last, he consoled himself with the thought that Birbal was now free and independent of all earthly fetters, and as the rays of the sun were sufficient for him, there was no necessity that he should be cleansed by fire.

Folklore and legacy

Origins
Akbar-Birbal folk tales were passed on mainly by oral tradition. They focus on how Birbal manages to outsmart envious courtiers who try to trap and portray him in poor light in front of Akbar, often in a humorous manner with him shown giving sharp and intelligent responses. Others show his interactions with the Emperor which involve him trying to test Birbal's wit and Birbal making him realise his folly, which always ends with Akbar getting amused and impressed. He occasionally challenges Birbal by giving him a line of poetry which Birbal has to complete. Some of the other stories are simple humorous anecdotes. Getting an advantage in a seemingly impossible situation and making his challengers look silly are usual occurrences in these tales.

According to C. M. Naim, the earliest known reference of Birbal's wit is in the 18th-century biographical dictionary, Ma'athir al-Umara in which he, thanks to his poetry and wit, becomes a member of Akbar's inner circle and gradually outranks all other courtiers. Naim draws a parallel between the Akbar-Birbal tales with others in Indian folklore involving a king and his quick-witted minister such as the Vijayanagara emperor, Krishnadevaraya and Tenali Ramakrishna and King Krishnachandra of Nadia and his barber, Gopal Bhar. 
In later years, a third character, Mulla Do-Piyaza began to appear. He was very likely a fictional character and was portrayed as Birbal's Muslim counterpart and a proponent of orthodox Islam.
However, when viewed within the context of folkloric literature, these stories, much like other similar tales like those of Krishnadevaraya and Tenali Rama, make fun of the human imperfections in the character of the king and then offer a corrective to his behaviour.

Historic role versus folklore
In the folk tales, he is always portrayed as a pious Hindu, being elder than Akbar, and being morally strict in the midst of opposing Muslim courtiers, who are shown plotting against him; his success was only because of his skill and he convinces the Emperor to favour Hinduism over Islam. He is thus depicted as acquiring religious, political and personal influence over Akbar, using his intelligence and sharp tongue and never resorting to violence. However, historically he never played such a role.

Badayuni mistrusted him but did mention that he was "having a considerable amount of capacity and genius". The Braj language poet, Rai Hol, praised Akbar and his nine jewels, having a special emphasis on Birbal for his generosity. Abul Fazl respected him by emphasising on his spiritual excellence and position as a confidant of the Emperor rather than on his wit or poetry.

Modern Hindu scholars assert that he made Akbar make bold decisions and the orthodox Muslims in the court despised him, since he made Akbar renounce Islam. But no evidence is present that he influenced Akbar's beliefs. Though sources suggest he influenced Akbar's policies to some extent. It was Akbar's affection for him, his religious tolerance and social liberalism which was the reason for this and Birbal was not the cause. Historically, he was more of a supporter of Akbar's religious policy and his religion, Din-i-Ilahi. Ain-i-Akbari mentions an incident involving prostitutes, where Akbar wanted to punish him, contrary to how he is portrayed as a deeply religious man.

In popular culture
Akbar and Birbal folk tales are featured in Amar Chitra Katha and Chandamama children's comics and many books are available containing these collections. There are various paperback editions, films, textbooks, booklets and plays with his character as the lead. The television channel Cartoon Network in India, has two featured animated series based on him, Chota Birbal and Akbar & Birbal. Salman Rushdie's novel The Enchantress of Florence has the character of Birbal. Akbar Birbal is a 2014 historical comedy show originally broadcast by Big Magic, it was followed by Hazir Jawab Birbal in 2015. Akbar Ka Bal Birbal is another historical comedy show about Akbar and Birbal that aired on Star Bharat in 2020.

References

Further reading 
50 Wittiest Tales of Birbal by Clifford Sawhney (Publishers: Pustak Mahal, Delhi).

Mughal nobility
1528 births
1586 deaths
People from Agra
Humour and wit characters of India
Hindi-language poets
Mughal Empire poets
Akbar